Bahgarah is the name of a village in the district of Darrang, a district of Asom in India.

Demography
Bahgarah consists of seven villages inhabited by both Hindus and Muslims. The [Muslim]s in this village are called [Goria]s. They are the descendants of the soldiers who invaded [Asom] in 1206 AD under the leadership of [Bakhtiar Uddin Khilji],and the later part of the 14th century.

The [Muslim]s are originally from modern day [Malda] district of West Bengal.

Etymology
The name has come from the word "Bah" meaning bamboo and "Gar" meaning fort.

It is said that in the course of the battle of Saraighat when Ram Singh  attacked [Asom] the people of this locality built a fence of bamboo to ward off the enemy. And it has been attested by [Edward Gait] that when Ram Singh attacked this place with 200 horsemen he could not enter the village because of the bamboo fence. The village was renamed Bahgarah.

Geography of Assam
Villages in Darrang district